London Calling is a 2011 book by British author James Craig. The book was an E-book bestseller before being published in print.

Synopsis
The novel is set in the lead up to an election. A murderer is on the loose and stalking Edgar Carlton the man set to become Prime Minister. Inspector John Carlyle must track down the killer before Carlton takes the law into his own hands.

Reception
In the Washington Times the book was described as a 'hard-bitten political thriller' while in the Milwaukee Journal-Sentinel the book was praised as a 'pitch-perfect debut'

References

2011 British novels
Novels set in London
British thriller novels
Political thriller novels
Novels about elections
Crime novels
British political novels
Constable & Robinson books